Midsummer Is Full of Love (working title: Midsummer Is Full of Hearts) is a Chinese television series starring Yang Chaoyue and Xu Weizhou. The series is based on the Korean manhwa Full House written by Won Soo-yeon, and a remake of the popular South Korean drama Full House.

Synopsis
Cute amateur musician Luo Tianran met big star Jin Zeyi by accident, because of the difference of their personality, a series of funny stories happened.

Cast

Main

Supporting

Production
The series began filming in July 2019 in Wuxi, and wrapped up in September 2019.

References 

Upcoming television series
Chinese romantic comedy television series
2020 Chinese television series debuts
2020 web series debuts
Chinese web series
Tencent original programming
Television series by Tencent Penguin Pictures
Chinese television series based on South Korean television series